Diligente was a 68-gun ship of the line of the Spanish Navy, launched in 1756.

She fought at the Battle of Cape St Vincent in 1780, where she was captured by the Royal Navy and commissioned as the third rate HMS Diligente. She was sold out of the navy in 1784 and out of Spain.

Notes

References

Lavery, Brian (2003) The Ship of the Line – Volume 1: The development of the battlefleet 1650–1850. Conway Maritime Press. .

Diligente (1756)
Ships of the line of the Royal Navy
1756 ships